The Ångermanlands Fotbollförbund (Ångermanland Football Association) is one of the 24 district organisations of the Swedish Football Association. It administers lower tier football in the historic province of Ångermanland.

It was established on 1 July 1933, when Västernorrland County Football Association was disbanded, and split into the Ångermanland Football Association and the Medelpad Ångermanland Football Association.

Background 

Ångermanlands Fotbollförbund, commonly referred to as Ångermanlands FF, is the governing body for football in the historic province of Ångermanland, which roughly corresponds with the county of Västernorrland. The Association currently has 55 member clubs.  Based in Örnsköldsvik, the Association's Chairman is Lars Olof Wengelin.

Affiliated Members 

The following clubs are affiliated to the Ångermanlands FF:

Anundsjö IF
Arnäs IF
Bik Sportklubb
Billsta IF
Bjärtrå IS
Björna IF
BK Örnen Örnsköldsvik
Bollsta IK
Djuptjärns IK
Docksta BTK
Domsjö IF
Edsele AIK
Forsmo IF
Frånö SK
Friska Viljor Akademi FC
Friska Viljor FC
Gideå IK
Gottne IF
Graninge FF
Hägglunds IoFK
Härnösands AIK
Härnösands FC United
Härnösands SK
Holmstrand-Helgums SK
Husums IF FK
IFK Nyland
Junsele IF
Köpmanholmen-Bjästa IF
Kramfors-Alliansen
Kubbe-Norrflärke IF
Långsele AIF
Mellansel IF
Modo FF
Moelvens FC
Moffe BK
Molidens IK
Myckelgensjö IF
Nätra GIF
Norabygdens IK
Nordingrå SK
Ramsele IK
Ramviks IF
Remsle UIF FF
Resele IF
Salsåker-Ullångers IF
Sidensjö IK
Själevads IK
Skorpeds SK
Sollefteå GIF FF
Stigsjö IK
Svedje IF
Trehörningsjö IF
Ådalslidens SK
Älandsbro AIK
Älgarna-Härnösands FF

League Competitions 
Ångermanlands FF run the following League Competitions:

Men's Football
Division 4  -  one section
Division 5  -  one section
Division 6  -  two sections

Women's Football
Division 3  -  one section

Footnotes

External links 
 Ångermanlands FF Official Website 

Ångermanlands
Football in Västernorrland County
1933 establishments in Sweden
Organizations established in 1933